Union for Peace in the Central African Republic (UPC) is a rebel group in the Central African Republic which controls southern parts of the country.

History 
UPC was formed on 17 September 2014 by Ali Darassa from ex-Séléka elements. Their initial headquarters was Bambari, however they were forced to retreat on 6 March 2017. On 10 January 2019, they launched a heavy attack on MINUSCA forces in Bambari vowing to recapture the city. They were repelled and in response Portuguese paratroopers raided their base in Bokolobo seizing some weapons and destroying some checkpoints. On 17 December 2020, the UPC joined the Coalition of Patriots for Change.

War crimes 
On 29 January 2019 18 people were killed and 23 wounded when UPC fighters opened fire during a funeral ceremony in Ippy. Between 2016 and 2020 UPC killed more than 1300 people. On 6 october 2021 34 civilians were killed by alleged UPC rebels in Matchika massacre.

Organization 
UPC used to profit from gold and diamond mines in areas it controls including the Ndassima mine, which they share control with the FPRC. They also profited from controlling cattle markets in Mobaye and Kouango.

References 

Factions of the Central African Republic Civil War
Rebel groups in the Central African Republic
Rebel groups that actively control territory